The 2018–19 Liga Iberdrola was the 82nd season of the Liga Iberdrola, Spain's premier field hockey league for women. It began on 23 September 2018 and it concluded on 2 June 2019.

Real Sociedad were the defending champions.

Teams
A total of 10 teams participated in the 2018–2019 edition of the Liga Iberdrola. The promoted team was Tenis, who replaced RC Jolaseta.

Results

Regular season

Table

Fixtures

Play–down
As the second placed team in the 2018–19 Primera División, CH Pozuelo played in a two-match relegation/promotion series against Atlètic Terrassa. 

|}

Play–offs

Quarter-finals

|}

 
 
Club de Campo won the series 2–0.

 
 
Club Egara won the series 2–1 in penalties, after the series finished 1–1.

 
 
Júnior won the series 1–0.

 
 
Sanse Complutense won the series 2–0.

Semi-finals

Final

Top goalscorers

References

External links
Official website

División de Honor Femenina de Hockey Hierba
Spain
field hockey
field hockey